Anagrapha falcifera, the celery looper, is a moth of the family Noctuidae. The species was first described by William Kirby in 1837. It is found in North America from Newfoundland, Labrador and southern Canada to Georgia, Mississippi, Texas, Arizona, Idaho, Washington and Oregon.

The wingspan is 35–40 mm.

The larvae feed on beets, blueberries, clover, corn, lettuce, plantain, viburnum and other low plants.

External links

Plusiinae
Moths of North America
Moths described in 1837